Piana–Mwanga Hydroelectric Power Station, also Mpiana–Mwanga Hydroelectric Power Station, is a  hydroelectric power station in the Democratic Republic of the Congo. The power plant was originally commissioned in 1933 to service a nearby tin mine. The tin mine was mothballed in 1982 and so was the power station.

Location
The power station is located across the Luvua River (a tributary of the Congo River), in the town of Piana Mwanga, in Manono Territory, in the Tanganyika Province of DR Congo.
The geographical coordinates of Piana–Mwanga Hydroelectric Power Station are 07°38'55.0"S, 28°05'36.0"E  (Latitude:-7.648611; Longitude:28.093333).

Overview
AVZ Minerals Limited, based in Australia is in the process of developing the lithium and tin Manono–Kitotolo Mine, in the town of Manono, DRC. As part of the infrastructure to develop that development, AVZ, through its subsidiary AVZ Power Limited has agreed with the Congolese authorities to explore the possibility of acquiring the abandoned Piana-Mwanga HPP, rehabilitating it and using the 54 megawatts generated there to support its mining activities in Manono Territory. A feasibility study has been authorized, the outcome of which, will inform those decisions.

Other considerations
When the refurbishment starts, AVZ Power Limited hopes to start with two turbines with capacity of 9 megawatts each, for a total of 18 megawatts. Later, all six turbines will be replaced, for a total of 54 megawatts of output. The transmission grid and distribution network within the town of Manono and in Manono Territory will also require refurbishment.

See also
 List of power stations in the Democratic Republic of the Congo
 Katende Hydroelectric Power Station

References

External links
 AVZ Minerals' Manono Lithium and Tin Project on cusp of reaching bankable status As of 18 August 2021. 

Tanganyika Province
Dams in the Democratic Republic of the Congo
Hydroelectricity in the Democratic Republic of the Congo
Hydroelectric power stations in the Democratic Republic of the Congo